Dainik Shivner is a Marathi language newspaper founded on 20 November 1955 by Vishwanathrao Wable (Shivnerkar). It is published daily in Mumbai, India and has a circulation of 25,000.

Its stated mission is "to serve the downtrodden, Dalits, labourers and to spread a message of secularism and national integrity." Dainik Shivner, Saamaanya Janatecha Buland Aawaz The paper's editor is Narendra Vishwanthrao Wable .

References

External links 

 Official website

Marathi-language newspapers
Newspapers published in Mumbai
1955 establishments in Bombay State
Newspapers established in 1955